Mensdorf is a small town in the commune of Betzdorf, in eastern Luxembourg.  , the town has a population of 765.

Local associations 
Mensdorf is home to a fanfare band, Fanfare de Mensdorf, which was founded on 1952. It is member of the Union Grand-Duc Adolphe U.G.D.A.

The band is formed by players of wind instruments and percussion instruments.

External links

Betzdorf, Luxembourg
Towns in Luxembourg